Svetoslav Konstantinov Minkov (12 February 1902 – 22 November 1966) was a Bulgarian absurdist fiction writer.

Biography 
Minkov was born in Radomir in 1902 in a military family. His older brother Asen died in the Second Balkan War, while his other brother Ivan, a member of the Bulgarian Communist Party, committed suicide in 1925 to evade arrest by the oppressive Tsarist authorities. Minkov received his primary education in Radomir, and graduated from a high school in Sofia.

His sister Teodora introduced him to the Bulgarian literary circles of the 1920s. He published his first work - Newton's binomial in the "Bulgaran" magazine in 1920. He was later enrolled in a military college in Austria, where he studied the works of Goethe, Nietzsche, Edgar Allan Poe, Henrik Ibsen and the Russian classical authors. Minkov was known for his eccentric character and suffered from bizarre, paranoid phobias, pervasive obsessive thoughts and nightmares.

He studied at Sofia University for a brief period of time before departing for Munich in 1922. There he spent some of his best years, paying more attention to contacts with the local bohemians than to studies. He came back to his native country in 1923, and started working as a librarian for the SS. Cyril and Methodius National Library. Before 1942, Minkov visited a number of countries in Europe, Asia and South America. Between 1942 and 1943 he worked in the Bulgarian embassy in Tokyo. After 1944, he began working in a number of Communist-oriented newspapers. From 1954 to 1962 he was a chief editor at the "Bulgarski pisatel" printing house.

Minkov died in Sofia on November 22, 1966.

Style 
Svetoslav Minkov is considered a pioneer of Bulgarian science fiction. He was a unique figure in Bulgarian literature – his talent and style were largely isolated from the local literary tendencies of the 1920s and 1930s, and he had no followers.

His works primarily concern the loss of identity in the technocratic world, social uniformity under the influence of technology, the uncertainty of morality and values and the existential aspects of boredom. Minkov vividly expresses his ideas by means of parody, diabolism, sarcasm and absurdism.

He also wrote numerous tales for children, studies on Japanese culture, and translated the tales of Scheherazade into Bulgarian.

Selected works 
 The Blue Chrysanthemum, 1922
 Clock, 1924
 Firebird, 1927
 Shadow play, 1928
 The House at the Last Lantern, 1931
 Automatons, 1932
 Heart in a Cardboard Box, 1933
 The Lady With the X-Ray Eyes, 1934
 Madrid is On Fire, 1936
 Tales in a Hedgehog Skin, 1936
 Guest, 1938
 The Iron House, 1941
 Youth of the Ape, 1942
 Empire of Starvation, 1950
 Panopticum, 1966

References 

 Complete bibliographical reference (in Bulgarian)

See also 
 Geo Milev, another Bulgarian author and representative of Diabolism

Bulgarian writers
Bulgarian science fiction writers
20th-century Bulgarian writers
Japanologists
1902 births
1966 deaths
People from Radomir (town)
20th-century Bulgarian historians
University of National and World Economy alumni